Gnevny was the fifth ship of the  of the Soviet Navy.

Construction and career
The ship was built at North Nikolayev Shipyard in Mykolaiv and was launched on 30 November 1958 and commissioned into the Black Sea Fleet on 10 January 1960.

In 1961, the ship made an ultra-long-distance transition from the Black Sea around Europe, and then - via the Northern Sea Route to the base of the Pacific Fleet.

On May 19, 1966, the ship like all ships of Project 57-bis, was reclassified into the Large Missile Ship (BRK).

She twice visited Massawa in Ethiopia (January 1967 and 1969) and Casablanca in Morocco (October 1968 and April 1978), as well as once Aden in South Yemen (January 1969), Nairobi in Mauritius (April 1969), Bombay in India (November 1975), Vancouver in Canada (August 1976).

While in the war zone, she performed combat missions to provide assistance to the armed forces of Egypt (June 1967 and from April to December 1968), Syria (June 1967).

On March 13, 1969, she was transferred to the Pacific Fleet (Pacific Fleet). In the period from 1972 to 1973, it was modernized according to the project 57-A in Vladivostok at the Dalzavod shipyard. On March 7, 1974, the ship was reclassified as a Large anti-submarine ship (BOD).

On April 8, 1988, the ship was decommissioned, disarmed and expelled from the Navy, in connection with the transfer to the OFI for dismantling and sale, and on July 17 of the same year her crew was disbanded.

Gallery

References

In Russian

External links

 
 
Gallery of the ship. Navsource. Retrieved 11 August 2021

Ships built at Shipyard named after 61 Communards
Kanin-class destroyers
1958 ships
Cold War destroyers of the Soviet Union